Dylan Bennett (born 17 September 1984 in Eindhoven) is a professional squash player who represents Netherlands. He reached a career-high world ranking of World No. 43 in June 2007.

References

External links 
 
 

1984 births
Living people
Dutch male squash players
Sportspeople from Eindhoven